Senator Barrow may refer to:

Members of the United States Senate
Alexander Barrow (1801–1846), U.S. Senator from Louisiana from 1841 to 1846
Middleton P. Barrow (1839–1903), U.S. Senator from Georgia from 1882 to 1883

United States state senate members
Regina Barrow (born 1966), Louisiana State Senate
Washington Barrow (1807–1866), Tennessee State Senate